Death train may refer to:
Death trains, an alternative name for Holocaust trains, used to transport Jews to Nazi concentration and extermination camps
Death Train, a novel by Alastair MacNeill, based on the UNACO screenplay by Alistair MacLean
Death Train, first of The Sergeant series of novels by Len Levinson writing as Gordon Davis
"Death Train", a song from the album Sinking the Eight Ball by Ruby Joe
"The Death Train", El tren de la muerte, or La Bestia, a dangerous network of Mexican freight trains that are utilized by U.S.- bound migrants to more quickly traverse the length of Mexico

Film and television
Death Train, 1993 TV movie starring Pierce Brosnan, based on the novel by Alastair MacNeill
Death Train, alternative name for Beyond the Door III, 1989 Italian horror film
Death Train, last of the 2004 Hideshi Hino's Theater of Horror series of Japanese horror films
The Death Train, 1978 Australian TV film starring Hugh Keays-Byrne

See also
Ghost train (disambiguation)
Haunted  Train (disambiguation)
Phantom train (disambiguation)